Simple Kaul Loomba is an Indian television actress who appeared in television series like Kutumb, Shararat, Taarak Mehta Ka Ooltah Chashmah, Oye Jassie, Yam Hain Hum, Dilli Wali Thakur Gurls  and Ziddi Dil Maane Na.

Early life
Simple Kaul was born in Mumbai and learnt Hindustani classical music in her early years. She married Rahul Loomba in 2010.

Entrepreneurship 
Simple is the co-owner of four restaurants, three in Mumbai and one in Bangalore, along with her friends Addite Shirwaikar and Vatsala Rajeev Raj.

Filmography

Television

References

External links

 
 

Living people
Indian television actresses
Actresses from Mumbai
Actresses in Hindi television
Year of birth missing (living people)